The brown-tailed miner bee (Andrena fuscicauda) is a species of miner bee in the family Andrenidae. Another common name for this species the dark-tailed andrena. It is found in North America.

References

Further reading

 
 

fuscicauda
Articles created by Qbugbot
Insects described in 1904